Phallangothelphusa is a genus of crabs in the family Pseudothelphusidae. It contains five described species:

Species
 Phallangothelphusa dispar (Zimmer, 1912)
 Phallangothelphusa magdalenensis Campos, 1998
 Phallangothelphusa juansei Campos, 2010
 Phallangothelphusa martensis Cardona & Campos, 2012
 Phallangothelphusa tangerina Campos, Lasso & Arias, 2019

References

Pseudothelphusidae